Oleria tigilla is a species of butterfly of the family Nymphalidae. It is found in Ecuador and Peru.

The wingspan is about 45 mm.

References

Ithomiini
Nymphalidae of South America